The Wikmean (Wik Me'an) were an indigenous Australian people, one of the Wik tribes of the Cape York Peninsula of northern Queensland.

Country
The territory of the Wikmean consisted of an estimated , inland from Cape Keerweer.

Notes

Citations

Sources

Aboriginal peoples of Queensland